The following is a list of amphibians of Java and Bali, Indonesia from Iskandar (1998). There is a total of 41 amphibian species in Java, 9 of which are endemic to Java.

In Java, amphibian species commonly collected for human consumption include Limnonectes macrodon, Fejervarya cancrivora, Fejervarya limnocharis, and Fejervarya iskandari.

List
Family Ichthyophiidae (Asiatic Tailed Caecilians)
Ichthyophis hypocyaneus

Family Megophryidae (Litter Frogs)
Leptobrachium hasseltii
Megophrys montana

Family Bufonidae (True Toads)
Leptophryne borbonica
Leptophryne cruentata — endemic
Phrynoidis asper
Duttaphrynus melanostictus
Ingerophrynus biporcatus
Ingerophrynus parvus

Family Microhylidae (Narrow Mouth Frogs)
Kalophrynus minusculus
Kalophrynus pleurostigma
Kaloula baleata
Microhyla achatina
Microhyla palmipes
Oreophryne monticola — endemic to Bali and Lombok; not found on Java

Family Ranidae (True Frogs)
Huia masonii — endemic
Hylarana baramica
Hylarana chalconota
Hylarana erythraea
Hylarana nicobariensis
Odorrana hosii
Rana catesbeiana — introduced

Family Dicroglossidae (Fork Tongue Frogs)
Fejervarya cancrivora
Fejervarya limnocharis
Fejervarya iskandari — endemic
Limnonectes kuhlii
Limnonectes macrodon
Limnonectes microdiscus
Occidozyga lima
Occidozyga sumatrana

Family Rhacophoridae (South Asian Tree Frogs)
Nyctixalus margaritifer — endemic
Philautus aurifasciatus
Philautus jacobsoni — endemic
Philautus pallidipes — endemic
Philautus vittiger — endemic
Polypedates leucomystax
Rhacophorus javanus — endemic
Rhacophorus margaritifer — endemic
Rhacophorus reinwardtii

Family Hylidae (Australo-Papuan Tree Frogs)
Litoria javana — dubious

Family Pipidae (African Clawed Toads)
Xenopus laevis — introduced
Hymenochirus sp. — introduced

References

Kusrini MD, Lubis MI, Darmawan B. 2008. The Tree Frog of Chevron Geothermal Concession, Mount Hakimun-Salak National Park - Indonesia. Technical report submitted to the Wildlife Trust – Peka Foundation.

See also
List of amphibians and reptiles of Mount Halimun Salak National Park
List of amphibians of Sumatra

Fauna of Java
Amphibians of Indonesia
Indonesia